There are two towns in Wisconsin named Plover:

Plover, Portage County, Wisconsin
Plover, Marathon County, Wisconsin